The 1966 All-Ireland Under-21 Hurling Championship  was the third staging of the All-Ireland Under-21 Championship since its establishment by the Gaelic Athletic Association in 1964. The championship began on 27 March 1966 and ended on 3 November 1966

Wexford entered the championship as the defending champions.

The All-Ireland final, the only one to have gone to two replays, was eventually decided on 3 November 1966 at Croke Park in Dublin, between Cork and Wexford, in what was their first ever championship meeting. Cork won the match by 9-09 to 5-09 to claim their first championship title.

Cork's Charlie McCarthy and Seánie Barry were the championship's top scorers.

Results

Leinster Under-21 Hurling Championship

First round

Quarter-finals

Semi-finals

Final

Munster Under-21 Hurling Championship

Quarter-finals

Semi-finals

Final

All-Ireland Under-21 Hurling Championship

Semi-finals

Finals

Championship statistics

Top scorers

Top scorer overall

Miscellaneous

 Wexford beat Laois to win their third Leinster title in succession.
 Following the first All-Ireland final between Cork and Wexford, referee Donie Nealon had to be escorted from the pitch after dismissing two players, one from each team.
 The All-Ireland final went to a replay for the first time ever.  It was also the only occasion that a final went to two replays.
 Cork's All-Ireland victory came a month after their All-Ireland success at senior level. Gerald McCarthy was the captain for both teams.

References

Under-21
All-Ireland Under-21 Hurling Championship